The name Sanvu has been used to name three tropical cyclones in the northwestern Pacific Ocean. The name is a Coral and was submitted by Macao.

 Severe Tropical Storm Sanvu (2005) (T0510, 10W, Huaning) – struck China.
 Severe Tropical Storm Sanvu (2012) (T1202, 03W) – remained in open sea.
 Typhoon Sanvu (2017) (T1715, 17W)

Pacific typhoon set index articles